Charles Eldridge O'Neal (January 6, 1904 – August 29, 1996) was an American film and television screenwriter and novelist.

Life and career
Charles Eldridge O'Neal was born in Raeford, North Carolina, the son of Elizabeth Maude (née Belton) of English descent, and Charles Samuel O'Neal of Irish descent. He attended the University of Iowa, then moved to San Diego, where he joined an acting troupe that included his future wife, Patricia O'Callaghan. After publishing a short story in Esquire, he decided to forgo performing and turned to screenwriting mostly B-movies, among them The Seventh Victim, Cry of the Werewolf, The Missing Juror, I Love a Mystery, Montana, and Golden Girl. O'Neal's television credits include The 20th Century Fox Hour and The Untouchables. Together with Abe Burrows, O'Neal adapted his 1949 novel The Three Wishes of Jamie McRuin for the short-lived 1952 musical Three Wishes for Jamie. The production ran on Broadway March 21–June 7, 1952.

O'Neal is the father of actor Ryan O'Neal and screenwriter/actor Kevin O'Neal and grandfather of Tatum, Griffin, Patrick, Redmond O'Neal. He died in Los Angeles, California at the age of 92.

Selected filmography

Actor
 The Hearts of Age (1934)

Writer
Selected feature film credits are listed in The American Film Institute Catalog of Motion Pictures.
 You're Telling Me (1942, credited as Charles O'Neil)
 The Seventh Victim (1943)
 The Missing Juror (1944)
 Cry of the Werewolf (1944)
 I Love a Mystery (1945)
 The Falcon's Alibi (1946)
 The Unknown (1946)
 The Devil's Mask (1946)
 Something in the Wind (1947)
 Return of the Bad Men (1948)
 Montana (1950)
 Mutiny (1952)
 Golden Girl (1952)
 Vice Squad (1953)
 Johnny Trouble (1957)
 The Alligator People (1959)
 Lassie's Great Adventure (1963)

Awards
O'Neal received the first Christopher Award for his debut novel The Three Wishes of Jamie McRuin (1949).

References

External links

 Papers of Charles O'Neal 1938–1982, Special Collections Department, University of Iowa Libraries

1904 births
1996 deaths
20th-century American novelists
American male novelists
American people of English descent
American people of Irish descent
American male screenwriters
People from Raeford, North Carolina
20th-century American dramatists and playwrights
American male dramatists and playwrights
Screenwriters from North Carolina
20th-century American male writers
University of Iowa alumni
20th-century American screenwriters